Aaron Ramirez (born July 29, 1964) is an American long-distance runner. He competed in the men's 10,000 metres at the 1992 Summer Olympics.

References

1964 births
Living people
Athletes (track and field) at the 1992 Summer Olympics
American male long-distance runners
Olympic track and field athletes of the United States
Track and field athletes from Texas
People from Mission, Texas
20th-century American people